The Ed Eskelin Ranch is a historic residential and agricultural complex in Lake County, Oregon, United States. As a historic resource, the complex captures elements of two different phases of early 20th century settlement in the Fort Rock basin. It represents the perseverance and resourcefulness required of modest-scale ranchers and farmers in frontier conditions and during economic hardship. Architecturally, the ranch preserves excellent examples of the construction styles and knowledge in use by common homesteaders in the period, as well as elements of the Finnish cultural heritage of the region.

History
The first influx of settlers began around 1909, driven by the 1909 Enlarged Homestead Act and the 1916 Stock-Raising Homestead Act, as well as Union Pacific Railroad promotion and publicity from the Lewis and Clark Centennial Exposition of 1905. Prominent among the settler population in this period were Finnish and Norwegian immigrant farmers including Fred Eskelin. However, many settlers were drawn by the unusually wet weather in years before 1909; when precipitation returned to its long-term, semiarid average, the large majority of settlers, including the Eskelin family, were unable to sustain agricultural operations in the dry conditions and abandoned their homesteads.

The second phase of settlement came in the 1930s with new approaches to irrigation that enabled production in the near-desert conditions of the Fort Rock basin. During this time, Fred and Ed Eskelin returned to the basin with their families and established a well drilling business alongside their agricultural operations. They built a new homestead, with both new construction as well as salvaging materials and whole buildings from disused properties around the area. The new homestead was laid out on a plan derived from traditional compounds in Finland; this Old World design provides a last link to the ethnic character of the first phase of settlement, which was all but extinguished except for the Eskelins. The success of this new venture led to Ed Eskelin's role as a prominent citizen in the basin, and to the long-term preservation of the homestead compound.

The complex was listed on the National Register of Historic Places in 1991.

Historic features
Historic features of the ranch complex include:
House — Built as a school 1913, relocated to current site 1938, remodeled 1939
Barn — Built 1938, expanded 1947
Granary — Built as a house ca. 1910, relocated to current site and repurposed 1937
Privy — Built 1913 (along with house), relocated to current site 1939
Garage — Built ca. 1912–1915, relocated to current site 1940
Well derrick — Built ca. 1935
Well drilling machine — Built 1934–1935
Windbreak and shade trees — Planted ca. 1935
Irrigation ditches — Dug ca. 1935 – ca. 1940
Shop building — Built 1945 from lumber salvaged from the 1910 Finley Homestead
Woodshed — Built ca. 1910 as a homestead cabin, relocated to current site and repurposed 1945

See also
National Register of Historic Places listings in Lake County, Oregon

Notes

References

External links

Finnish-American history
National Register of Historic Places in Lake County, Oregon
Ranches on the National Register of Historic Places in Oregon